Thomas Turner was a Scottish footballer who played as a goalkeeper.

Career
Turner played club football for Arthurlie, and made one appearance for Scotland in 1884. He was later active as a referee, before emigrating to Australia.

References

Year of birth missing
Place of birth missing
Scottish footballers
Scotland international footballers
Arthurlie F.C. players
Association football goalkeepers
Year of death missing
Place of death missing